The 1998 Grand Prix de Tennis de Toulouse was a men's tennis tournament played on Indoor Hard in Toulouse, France that was part of the International Series of the 1998 ATP Tour. It was the seventeenth edition of the tournament and was held from 28 September – 4 October.

Seeds
Champion seeds are indicated in bold text while text in italics indicates the round in which those seeds were eliminated.

Draw

Finals

Qualifying

Qualifying seeds

Qualifiers
  Lionel Barthez /  Guillaume Marx

Qualifying draw

References

External links
 Official results archive (ATP)
 Official results archive (ITF)

Doubles
Grand Prix de Tennis de Toulouse